

Player statistics
Appearances for competitive matches only

|}

Topscorers

Allsvenskan

Svenska Cupen

Friendlies

Competitions

Overall

Allsvenskan

League table

1999–00 Svenska Cupen

Friendlies

References

1999
Swedish football clubs 1999 season